Osco Township is one of twenty-four townships in Henry County, Illinois, USA.  As of the 2010 census, its population was 459 and it contained 193 housing units.  Osco changed its name from Essex Township on April 13, 1857.

Geography

Unincorporated towns
 Morristown at 
 Osco at 
(This list is based on USGS data and may include former settlements.)

Adjacent townships
 Edford Township (north)
 Geneseo Township (northeast)
 Munson Township (east)
 Cambridge Township (southeast)
 Andover Township (south)
 Lynn Township (southwest)
 Western Township (west)
 Colona Township (northwest)

Cemeteries
The township contains these two cemeteries: Grace Episcopal and Morristown.

Demographics

School districts
 Cambridge Community Unit School District 227
 Geneseo Community Unit School District 228
 Orion Community Unit School District 223

Political districts
 Illinois's 14th congressional district
 State House District 71
 State Senate District 36

References
 United States Census Bureau 2008 TIGER/Line Shapefiles
 
 United States National Atlas

External links
 City-Data.com
 Illinois State Archives
 Township Officials of Illinois

Townships in Henry County, Illinois
Townships in Illinois